Unión Callao was a Peruvian football club, playing in the city of Callao, Lima, Peru.

History
The club Unión Callao was founded on the Callao, Lima.

The club was the 1950, 1952, and 1954 Segunda División Peruana.

Unión Callao participated in the Peruvian Primera División, in 1951, 1953 and 1955.

Honours

National
Peruvian Segunda División: 3
Winners (3): 1950, 1952, 1954
Runner-up (1): 1946

Regional
Liga Regional de Lima y Callao:
Winners (1): 1945
Runner-up (1): 1944

See also
List of football clubs in Peru
Peruvian football league system

External links
 Unión Callao: Canario en la gran liga
 Peru 2nd Division Champions (Lima)
 Peruvian First Division

Football clubs in Peru